The Cross of Alcoraz is the name given to a heraldic coat of arms and flag made up of the Cross of Saint George, or cross of gules on Argent, with a Maure, or Moor's head, in each quarter. The earliest documented evidence of these arms is in a rare lead-sealed decree from the chancery of Peter III of Aragon, circa 1281, most likely used as the King's personal coat of arms, alluding to the spirit of the Crusades and his ancestral namesake, Peter I of Aragon.  The arms also appear in the third quarter of the current Coat of arms of Aragon. 

According to XIVth century sources, the 'Cross of Alcoraz' traditionally originated with the Battle of Alcoraz, (in 1096), as King Peter's battle shield, inspired by the legendary miraculous intervention of Saint George in the reconquista of Huesca. 
The earliest depiction of the cross, that of the chancery seal of 1281, shows four Moors' heads with beards but no head bands (or bandages).

Throughout the Middle Ages up to the 20th century, both Aragonese and international variants, (viz. flag of Sardinia), have either turned the orientation of the Moor's heads, made them face each other symmetrically, or have depicted them as the heads of Saracen kings with open crowns.

This heraldic coat of arms was directly attributed to the Kingdom of Aragon from the mid XVth century, and was also adopted as the royal standard of the Kingdom of Sardinia from the second half of the XVth century, when the island was a territory of the Crown of Aragon.  In the Sardinian flag the Moors' heads were blindfolded.  In the modern flag of Sardinia the heads are facing right and the "blindfolds" have evolved to become headbands.

Rafael Conde, in "La bula de plomo de los reyes de Aragón y la cruz «de Alcoraz» (The leaden seal of the Kings of Aragon and the Cross of Alcoraz", pub. Emblemata, XI (2005), p. 77, points out that the adoption of the so-called «Cross of Alcoraz» by Sardinia most likely dates back to the end of the XVth century, according to a study on the Sardinian flag by Luisa D’Arienzo, in «Lo scudo dei “Quatro mori” e la Sardegna», in Annali della Facoltà di Scienze Politiche dell’Università di Cagliari, IX (1983), págs. 253-292, and «L’escut dels quatre moros», in Els catalans a Sardegna, a cura di Jordi Carbonell i Francesco Manconi, Barcelona, 1984, págs. 199-206.

See also 

 Moor's head (heraldry)
 Battle of Alcoraz

Notes

Bibliography 
 CONDE, Rafael , en "La bula de plomo de los reyes de Aragón y la cruz «de Alcoraz»", Emblemata, XI (2005), pp. 59–82 ISSN 1137-1056.
 MONTANER FRUTOS, Alberto, El señal del rey de Aragón: Historia y significado, Zaragoza, Institución «Fernando el Católico», 1995. ISBN 84-7820-283-8.
 REDONDO VEINTEMILLAS, Guillermo, Alberto Montaner Frutos y María Cruz García López, Aragón en sus escudos y banderas, Zaragoza, Caja de la Inmaculada, 2007 (Colección Mariano de Pano y Ruata, 26), pp. 19–20. ISBN 978-84-96869-06-6.
 DE MAYERNE TURQUET, Lewis, in "The Generall Historie of Spaine", p. 264, written in French by Lewis de Mayerne Turquet, 1583, Translated into English by Edward Grimeston, Published by A Flip and G. Eld, London, 1612.

Further reading 
 

Heraldry
History of Spain
Aragon